The Bangles are an American pop rock band formed in Los Angeles, California, in 1981. The band recorded several singles that reached the U.S. top 10 during the 1980s, including "Manic Monday" (1986), "Walk Like an Egyptian" (1986), "Hazy Shade of Winter" (1987), "In Your Room" (1988), and "Eternal Flame" (1989).

The band's classic lineup consisted of founding members Susanna Hoffs (guitar and vocals), Vicki Peterson (guitar and vocals), Debbi Peterson (drums and vocals), with Michael Steele (bass and vocals). As of June 2018, the band consisted of sisters Vicki and Debbi Peterson, Hoffs, and founding bassist Annette Zilinskas.

History

Formation and early years (1981–1983)
Susanna Hoffs and sisters Vicki and Debbi Peterson had each been in bands before coming together in Los Angeles, California, in December 1980. The impetus was two classified advertisements in the weekly paper The Recycler. One had been placed by Hoffs, and the only person to respond was Annette Zilinskas, and the other was by Lynn Elkind, the Petersons' housemate and a departing member of their then band Those Girls. When Hoffs called in response to Elkind's ad, Vicki Peterson answered the phone, and in their conversation, they discovered a great deal of common interests. When Hoffs spoke to Elkind after Peterson gave her the message, Hoffs and Elkind did not have the same common interests and Hoffs then formed a new band with the Petersons. The Those Girls bass guitarist, Vicki Peterson's lifelong best friend Amanda Hills, had also left the band (now a history professor, Amanda Hills Podany has performed as a guest with the Bangles on a few rare occasions) and this left an opening for Zilinskas. When Annette Zilinskas responded to the add in 'The Recycler", Hoffs told Zilinskas that the band was looking a bass player and asked if she would be interested. Zilinskas accepted and the lineup was set.  The resulting (and also current as of 2018) lineup first performed as The Colours in 1981.

Shortly afterward, the group renamed themselves The Bangs. The band was part of the Los Angeles Paisley Underground scene, which featured groups that played a mixture of 1960s-influenced rock. 
In 1981, Hoffs and the Petersons recorded and released a single ("Getting Out of Hand" with "Call on Me" on the B side) on DownKiddie Records (their own label). The Bangs were signed to Faulty Products, a label formed by Miles Copeland.

The early Bangles lineup of Susanna Hoffs (vocals/guitars), Vicki Peterson (guitars/vocals), Debbi Peterson (vocals/drums) and Annette Zilinskas (vocals/bass) recorded an EP in 1982 and released the single "The Real World".  For the release of the EP, they played in the Lhasa club in Hollywood.  At the last minute, they discovered another band had registered the Bangs name and would not let them use it without payment, so they dropped "The" and added the letters "les" to the end to become Bangles.  Erik Visser, the Dutch sound engineer, came up with the name The Bangles because he felt that their music was a sort of Beatle-ish.
. Their first EP was retitled Bangles and released. In 1983, Faulty Products issued a 12-inch "remix" single of "The Real World" to radio and media, but another setback came as the label folded. I.R.S. Records picked up distribution and reissued the EP. After Zilinskas left the band to focus on her own project Blood on the Saddle, she was replaced by Michael Steele, formerly of the all-female band the Runaways, Toni & the Movers, Slow Children and Elton Duck.

Career peak (1984–1989)

The Bangles' full-length debut album on Columbia Records, All Over the Place (1984), captured their power pop roots, featuring the singles "Hero Takes a Fall" and the Kimberley Rew-penned Beatlesque "Going Down to Liverpool" (originally recorded by Rew's band Katrina and the Waves). The record received good reviews and the video for "Liverpool" featured Leonard Nimoy, which helped to generate further publicity. This came about through a friendship between the Hoffs and Nimoy families. They received a much wider audience serving as the opening act for Cyndi Lauper on her Fun Tour.

All this went some way to attracting the attention of Prince, who gave them "Manic Monday" originally written for his group Apollonia 6. "Manic Monday" went on to become a number-two hit in the US, the UK and Germany, outsold at the time only by another Prince composition, his own "Kiss". The band's second album, Different Light (January 1986), was more polished than its predecessor, and with the help of the worldwide number-one hit "Walk Like an Egyptian" (written by Liam Sternberg), put the band firmly in the mainstream, reaching number two on the Billboard 200. The song was sent to them in midsession and the group was divided about whether it would be a failure or a success. When the song was released, the group was amazed to discover that it brought them a new audience of female fans, most of them very young. Commented Michael Steele to a Nine-O-One Network Magazine writer: "When I go out now it is usually girls who recognize me." Three additional hit singles released from the Different Light album were: "Following" (top 40 in Ireland), "Walking Down Your Street" (number 11 on the US Billboard Hot 100) and the wistful "If She Knew What She Wants", written and first recorded by Jules Shear (which reached 29 on the Hot 100 in the summer of 1986 and was in the German top 20 for 13 weeks).

The band had another hit with a cover of Simon & Garfunkel's "A Hazy Shade of Winter" (1987) from the soundtrack of the film Less than Zero. The song reached number 2 in February 1988.

The album Everything (1988) was produced by Davitt Sigerson, as the band had a negative reaction to working with David Kahne on Different Light. It was another multiplatinum hit and included the top-five hit "In Your Room", as well as their biggest-selling single "Eternal Flame". Co-writer Billy Steinberg came up with the title after Hoffs told him about the band's recent trip to Memphis, Tennessee, where they visited Graceland, Elvis Presley's estate. An eternal flame is maintained at Presley's grave, but it had gone out on the day of their visit, and its clear plastic enclosure was flooded. They asked what was in the box and were told, "That's the eternal flame." The single became their biggest worldwide hit and the biggest single by an all-female band in history. Hoffs was naked when she recorded the song, convinced by Sigerson that Olivia Newton-John got her amazing performances by recording everything naked. Hoffs said she felt it was like 'skinny dipping' and recorded most of the rest of the album naked.

Breakup (1989)
Friction arose among band members after music industry media began singling out Hoffs as the lead singer of the group. In fact, singing duties on the band's albums were divided among the band's members, each of whom wrote or co-wrote songs. The band broke up in 1989. Hoffs began a solo career and Vicki Peterson toured as a member of the Continental Drifters and as a fill-in member of the Go-Go's.

Reformation (1998–present)

The band started drifting back together in 1998, and officially reformed to record a song for the soundtrack of Austin Powers: The Spy Who Shagged Me, at the behest of the film's director Jay Roach (who had married Hoffs in 1993). The song chosen for the album was "Get the Girl" and was released in 1999. The reunion continued with a tour in 2000. Later the same year, the group was also inducted into the Vocal Group Hall of Fame. From 2001–2002, they were in the studio recording the album Doll Revolution at Icon Recording Studios, Hollywood, California. The album, featuring such songs as "Stealing Rosemary", "Ride the Ride", "Nickel Romeo", and the single "Something That You Said", was released in early 2003. The title track, which was written by Elvis Costello, was originally recorded for his 2002 album When I Was Cruel. Doll Revolution was a solid comeback success in Germany after the Bangles had performed in Germany's biggest television show Wetten dass, but failed to make any impact in other markets such as the UK, the U.S. and Australia. In July 2004, Paul McCartney presented the Bangles with "honorary rock'n'roll diplomas" from his Liverpool Institute for Performing Arts.

In 2005, Michael Steele left the band due to disputes over touring and recording. Steele was replaced by touring bassist Abby Travis for live appearances. On December 31, 2005, the group performed "Hazy Shade of Winter" in front of Times Square and later "Eternal Flame" as part of Dick Clark's New Year's Rockin' Eve 2006. Travis was fired in 2008.

In the spring of 2009, the Bangles returned to the studio to begin work on a new album entitled Sweetheart of the Sun, which was released on September 27, 2011. The band went on tour in late 2011 in support of it, with dates on the East Coast, Midwest and West Coast. Openers for the various dates included rock band Antigone Rising and power pop band A Fragile Tomorrow.

In December 2013, the Bangles played two nights with three other reunited Paisley Underground bands—the Dream Syndicate, the Three O'Clock and Rain Parade—at the Fillmore in San Francisco and the Fonda Theatre in Los Angeles (benefit concert). Their set list focused on their early material, with remarks from the band at the beginning of the Fillmore show that they were going to be playing songs that they had not played in 30 years. In January 2014, they performed at the Whisky a Go Go in West Hollywood, California, in celebration of the Whisky's 50th anniversary.

Original bassist Annette Zilinskas started joining the band for selected live shows in 2014 and rejoined the band in 2018. This was the first time the original founding four members of The Bangles had played together since 1983.

Three new recordings by the Bangles were released in November 2018 as part of a compilation album called 3 × 4, which also included the Dream Syndicate, the Three O'Clock and Rain Parade, with each of the four bands covering songs by the other bands. Following the initial Record Store Day first-release as a double album on "psychedelic swirl" purple vinyl, Yep Roc Records released the album on LP, CD and digital in February 2019. All four of these bands got together to play at the Grammy Museum in May of 2019.

Discography

Studio albums
 All Over the Place (1984)
 Different Light (1986)
 Everything (1988)
 Doll Revolution (2003)
 Sweetheart of the Sun (2011)

Awards and nominations
{| class=wikitable
|-
! Year !! Awards !! Work !! Category !! Result
|-
| rowspan=5|1987
| Brit Awards
| rowspan=2|Themselves 
| Best International Group
| 
|-
| Smash Hits Poll Winners Party
| Most Promising New Act
| 
|-
| American Video Awards
| rowspan=3|"Walk Like an Egyptian"
| Best Group Performance 
| 
|-
| rowspan=3|MTV Video Music Awards
| Best Group Video
| 
|-
| Best Choreography
| 
|-
| rowspan=3| 1988
| "Hazy Shade of Winter"
| Best Video from a Film
| 
|-
| Nickelodeon's Kids Choice Awards
| rowspan=3|Themselves 
| Favorite Music Group
| 
|-
| Pollstar Concert Industry Awards
| Next Major Arena Headliner
| 
|-
| 1989
| Smash Hits Poll Winners Party
| Best Group
| 
|-
| 1990
| ASCAP Pop Music Awards
| "Eternal Flame"
| Most Performed Song
| 
|-
| 2015
| She Rocks Awards
| Themselves
| Lifetime Achievement Award
|

Members

Current members 
 Susanna Hoffs – lead and harmony vocals, rhythm guitar (1981–1989, 1998–present)
 Debbi Peterson – drums, backing and lead vocals, acoustic guitar, percussion (1981–1989, 1998–present)
 Annette Zilinskas – bass guitar, harmonica (1981–1983, 2014, 2018–present)
 Vicki Peterson – lead guitar, backing and lead vocals (1981–1989, 1998–present)

Former member 
 Michael Steele – bass guitar, backing and lead vocals, acoustic guitar (1983–1989, 1998–2005)

Touring musicians 
 Abby Travis – bass guitar (2005–2008)
 Derrick Anderson – bass guitar (2008–2016)
 Walker Igleheart – keyboards (1980s)
 Greg "Harpo" Hilfman – keyboards (1989, 1998–2011)

Timeline

References

External links

 
 
 The Bangles Vocal Group Hall of Fame page
  Interview in Hard Times, May 1984

 
All-female bands
American soft rock music groups
American pop rock music groups
Brit Award winners
Columbia Records artists
Elektra Records artists
Epic Records artists
I.R.S. Records artists
Musical groups disestablished in 1989
Musical groups established in 1981
Musical groups from Los Angeles